The Tennessee Commissioner of Correction is the head of the Tennessee Department of Correction, which supervises inmates in the state prisons of the U.S. state of Tennessee. The incumbent Commissioner of Correction is Frank Strada, who took office on January 9, 2023.

Functionality
The Commissioner is appointed by the governor of Tennessee and is a member of the governor's Cabinet, which meets at least once per month, or more often to the governor's liking. By statute, the Commissioner must be over the age of 25 with training and experience in institutional operation and management. The Commissioner is also authorized to appoint a secretary and stenographer for the Department, who have charge of and keep a record of the transactions of the department. The Commissioner has the same power as a judge of the court of general sessions to administer oaths, and to enforce the attendance and testimony of witnesses.

History
Tennessee's first central prison, the Tennessee State Penitentiary, was first established in 1831 after legislation had been passed two years earlier. The Board of Inspectors consisted of five members including the Governor and the Secretary of State. In 1871 the position of Superintendent of Prisons was created, and in 1902 the Tennessee General Assembly passed legislation for a Board of Prison Commissioners. In 1915 the General Assembly created the State Board of Controls to manage charity, penal, and reformatory institutions. This, in turn, was replaced by an Administration of State Institutions made up of the Governor, the State Treasurer, and a general manager of State Organizations.

In 1923 legislative reform brought the first administration of the penal, charitable, and reformatory institutions by a Department of Institutions headed by a Commissioner of Institutions. In 1929 the Advisory Board of Pardons was established, which created a system of parole eligibility in 1931. The advisory board would be usurped by a Board of Pardons and Paroles, with appointments made by the Governor and the Chairman being the Commissioner of Institutions. Later on in 1979, after a series of changes, the Board would become autonomous of the Department, with the Chairman being appointed by the Governor and the Board's membership being increased to five.

In 1937 the Department's name was changed to the Department of Institutions and Public Welfare, receiving various responsibilities that today might be handled by the modern Department of Veterans Affairs, the Department of Education, and the Department of Mental Health and Developmental Disabilities. In 1939 this Department was split into the Department of Institutions, and a separate Department of Public Welfare, with mental health facilities being transferred to a Department of Mental Health in 1953.

In 1955 the department arrived at its present name, the Tennessee Department of Correction. In 1979 the five-year residency requirement for the Commissioner was lifted, and the Commissioner was authorized to contract with local governments when prisons became overcrowded. To the right is a table of Commissioners who have filled the function the modern Commissioner of Corrections fills today and the governors they have served under.

References

External links
 

 Correction